Desperately Seeking Santa is a television movie starring Laura Vandervoort and Nick Zano.  It premiered on ABC Family on November 27, 2011 in their Countdown to 25 Days of Christmas programming block. It is directed by Craig Pryce. It was filmed under the title Hunky Santa.

Plot
Jennifer Walker, PR manager for an aging shopping mall, runs a contest to replace the traditional mall Santa Claus with a "hunky Santa". But complications ensue when she falls in love with contest winner (and struggling restaurateur) David Moretti.

Cast
Laura Vandervoort as Jennifer Walker 
Nick Zano as David Moretti 
Paula Brancati as Marissa Marlet 
John Bregar as Neal McCormick 
Patrick Garrow as Edgar Hillridge 
Natalie Krill as Brittany 
Gerry Mendicino as Mr. Moretti 
Katie Griffin as Sonia Moretti 
Lisa Berry as Christine Mayweather

References

External links
 

2011 television films
2011 films
ABC Family original films
Canadian Christmas films
English-language Canadian films
2010s English-language films
Christmas television films
Canadian television films
Films directed by Craig Pryce
2010s Canadian films